Abhinava Chandrika (Sanskrit:अभिनव चन्द्रिका); , is a Sanskrit work on Dvaita philosophy written by Satyanatha Tirtha. It is a lucid adaptation of the well-known commentary on Jayatirthas Tattvaprakāśikā, which is a commentary on Madhvacharya's  Brahma-sutra bhashya. It runs to 12,600 granthas and is magnum opus of Satyanatha Tirtha.

References

Bibliography
 

 

Dvaita Vedanta
Philosophical literature
Sanskrit texts